Harrison County Courthouse may refer to:

 Harrison County Courthouse (Indiana), Corydon, Indiana
 Harrison County Courthouse (Iowa), Logan, Iowa
 Old Harrison County Courthouse (Iowa), Magnolia, Iowa
 Harrison County Courthouse (Kentucky), Cynthiana, Kentucky
 Harrison County Courthouse (Ohio), Cadiz, Ohio
 Old Harrison County Courthouse (Texas), Marshall, Texas